Kråkgränd (Swedish: "Crow Alley") is an alley in Gamla stan, the old town of Stockholm, Sweden.  Stretching between Skeppsbron and Österlånggatan, it forms a parallel street to Bredgränd and Nygränd.

The alley is named after Knut Nilsson Kråka, who in 1608 was promoted to become one of the 48 Elders of the city and in 1615 became a magistrate. He failed to deliver taxes required however and was subsequently relieved of his duties in 1623 and died as a custom officer by the southern gate in 1625.

See also 
 List of streets and squares in Gamla stan

References

External links 
 hitta.se - Location map
 Stockholmskällan - Historical photo

Streets in Stockholm